Dağ Bilici (also, Dağbilici and Dag-Bilidzhi) is a village and municipality in the Davachi Rayon of Azerbaijan.  It has a population of 696.  The municipality consists of the villages of Dağ Bilici and Mumlu.

References 

Populated places in Shabran District